WBOY-TV (channel 12) is a television station licensed to Clarksburg, West Virginia, United States, serving North Central West Virginia as an affiliate of NBC and ABC. Owned by Nexstar Media Group, the station maintains studios on West Pike Street in downtown Clarksburg, and its transmitter is located east of downtown and US 50.

The station identifies on-air as "Clarksburg/Fairmont/Morgantown" even though the third city is considered to be part of the Pittsburgh market. Despite this, WBOY-TV operates a news bureau in Morgantown which makes it the only commercial station to have facilities there.

History
The station was launched on November 17, 1957. It was the second television station in its small market. WBOY was originally intended to be the ABC affiliate for all of North-Central West Virginia. However, the area's intended NBC affiliate, Parkersburg's WTAP-TV, did not have a signal strong enough to reach Clarksburg and Weston. North-Central West Virginia is a very rugged dissected plateau and WTAP's analog signal on UHF channel 15 was not strong enough to carry across the terrain. After it became clear that Parkersburg and Clarksburg were going to be separate markets, WBOY joined NBC and remains with the network to this day. However, it retained a secondary ABC affiliation for many years. Its original owner was Friendly Broadcasting, who owned several stations including WSTV in Steubenville, Ohio. Rust Craft sold the station to Northern West Virginia TV Broadcasting Company in 1964.

Imes Communications of Columbus, Mississippi who also owned that city's CBS affiliate WCBI-TV bought the station in 1976, as well as ABC affiliate WMUR-TV in Manchester, New Hampshire. At that time, WBOY dropped the remainder of its ABC programming, allowing it to become a full NBC affiliate; as a result, cable systems began importing Pittsburgh's WTAE-TV for ABC programming. In early 2001, Hearst Television (the owner of WTAE-TV) acquired WBOY and WMUR from Imes; Hearst's acquisition of WBOY was finalized on April 30, 2001. In 2000, the FCC started to allow a company to own multiple stations with overlapping coverage areas. However, Hearst opted to keep WTAE-TV (one of its longtime flagship stations) and sold WBOY to West Virginia Media Holdings (which was creating a statewide "network" of stations to share resources) in September 2001; the sale closed on December 13 of that year.

WBOY launched a new second digital subchannel with ABC programming on August 1, 2008 with the branding Your ABC. Sister station WTRF-TV in Wheeling also launched an ABC subchannel at the same time. Previously, both the Clarksburg–Weston–Fairmont and Wheeling–Steubenville markets were served by WTAE as the de facto affiliate while WDTV aired select ABC Sports programming.

On November 17, 2015, Nexstar Broadcasting Group announced that it would purchase the West Virginia Media Holdings stations, including WBOY-TV, for $130 million. Under the terms of the deal, Nexstar assumed control of the stations through a time brokerage agreement in December 2015, with the sale of the license assets completed on January 31, 2017.

Programming

Syndicated programming
Syndicated programming on WBOY-TV includes Rachael Ray, The Doctors, Wheel of Fortune, Jeopardy!, and Dr. Phil, among others. Syndicated programming on WBOY-DT2 includes The Ellen DeGeneres Show, Funny You Should Ask, Comics Unleashed, and The Big Bang Theory, among others.

News operation
After being acquired by West Virginia Media Holdings, the station upgraded its news operation and built secondary studios in Morgantown on Scott Avenue. A major emphasis was placed on news from that town in the hopes of increasing ratings and thus getting the town reassigned to the Clarksburg/Fairmont market. The move made WBOY the highest rated station in Monongalia County according to Nielsen ratings beating even Pittsburgh stations. The channel produces a large amount of sports content relative to West Virginia University, located in that town, for use by the other member stations. Today, it is the only West Virginia Media Holdings station to have the lead in local news ratings in its respective market.

Nexstar Media produces a half-hour evening newscast that airs at 5:30 p.m. The newscast, titled West Virginia Tonight, is broadcast live from WOWK's Charleston studios in high definition on WOWK, WBOY, WVNS, WTRF and WDVM and is anchored by Mark Curtis and Amanda Barren. WBOY-DT2 simulcasts the weekday editions of 12 News at 5 a.m., 6 a.m., noon, 5, 5:30, 6, and 11 p.m. It does not simulcast weekend broadcasts from the main channel. In addition, there is a public affairs program called Inside West Virginia Politics hosted by Mark Curtis, airing Sundays at on all five Nexstar West Virginia stations.

On April 1, 2013, WBOY became the second station in the market and the last station owned by West Virginia Media Holdings to upgrade its local newscasts to high definition. With the upgrade came new graphics and a new music package (Aerial by Stephen Arnold).

Notable former staff
 Natalie Tennant – former WV Secretary of State
 Irv Weinstein – later the longtime anchor at WKBW radio and television in Buffalo, New York
 Erik Wells – former Democratic member of the West Virginia Senate

Technical information

Subchannels
The station's digital signal is multiplexed:

Analog-to-digital conversion
WBOY-TV shut down its analog signal, over VHF channel 12, on February 17, 2009, the original target date in which full-power television stations in the United States were to transition from analog to digital broadcasts under federal mandate (which was later pushed back to June 12, 2009). The station's digital signal relocated from its pre-transition UHF channel 52, which was among the high band UHF channels (52-69) that were removed from broadcasting use as a result of the transition, to its analog-era VHF channel 12.

References

External links
 

NBC network affiliates
Ion Mystery affiliates
Laff (TV network) affiliates
BOY-TV
Television channels and stations established in 1957
1957 establishments in West Virginia
Nexstar Media Group